This is a list of windmills in County Down, Northern Ireland.

Locations

Sources
Unless otherwise stated, the source for all entries is the linked Windmill World webpage.

References

See also 
 List of windmills in Ireland

County Down
Tourist attractions in County Down
Windmills
 
Windmills
Windmills